Maxillaria echinophyta is a species of orchid endemic to Brazil.

References

Orchids of Brazil
echinophyta
Plants described in 1877